Hatami is an Iranian surname and may refer to:

 Rahim Hatami-ye Yek, a village in Lorestan Province, Iran
 Ali Hatami (1944-1996), Iranian film director
 Farzad Hatami, Iranian footballer
 Leila Hatami (b. 1972), Iranian actress
 Mir Ebrahim Seyyed Hatami, Iranian cleric
 Hedayatollah Hatami

Persian-language surnames
Iranian-language surnames